"Tonight" is a song by the American rock band Blondie featuring Laurie Anderson, written by Charli XCX and Andrew Armstrong, produced by John Congleton and mixed by Chris Sheldon.

It was released as a special 1000 copies limited edition one-sided 7" promotional single, sold exclusively at Blondie's pop up shop at the Camden Market. It has also appeared as a hidden track after "Fragments" on the CD edition of the Pollinator album.

Track listing

References

2017 singles
2017 songs
Blondie (band) songs
Song recordings produced by John Congleton
Songs written by Charli XCX
Infectious Music singles